Kamran Ashraf Urdu:کامران اشرف (born September 30, 1973) is a  Banker  from Pakistan, who was born in Khanewal. He is an established International Banker.

Ashraf studied at Hailey College of Commerce and then did his MBA. He had keen interest in Cricket and played well throughout his youth. Kamran Ashraf started his successful career from Askari Bank. Moreover, Kamran Ashraf is currently working as Group Head Retail and Branch banking in Summit Bank of Pakistan. 
Father of 5, Two boys Usama Kamran and Abdul Sami and 3 daughters. 
Kamran Ashraf has keen interest in Social Welfare and keeps an eye on Political developments as well, He has deep love for Pakistan and its people. He has close terms with Prime Minister Imran Khan and PTI as its a symbol of positive change in Pakistan.

References

External links
 
 Pakistan Hockey Team

1973 births
Living people
Pakistani male field hockey players
Male field hockey forwards
Field hockey players from Karachi
Field hockey players at the 1996 Summer Olympics
Field hockey players at the 2000 Summer Olympics
1998 Men's Hockey World Cup players
Commonwealth Games medallists in field hockey
Commonwealth Games bronze medallists for Pakistan
Asian Games medalists in field hockey
Field hockey players at the 1994 Asian Games
Asian Games bronze medalists for Pakistan
Medalists at the 1994 Asian Games
Field hockey players at the 2002 Commonwealth Games
Olympic field hockey players of Pakistan
Medallists at the 2002 Commonwealth Games